The 560 series was the third and last series of Hewlett Packard's Pocket PC format Jornada devices. It debuted in October 2001.

Features 
 Reflective LCD screen
 Ambient light sensor
 Flashable ROM
 CompactFlash Type I slot
 Four quick-launch hardware keys
 IrDA infra red port
 8MiB of "Safe Store" flash memory
 240x320 65,536-colour touch-screen
 Pocket PC 2002 operating system

Accessories 

 Battery with MMC slot (not compatible with all SD)
 PDA hand-held digital camera with rotating lens PN: F1869A
 original HP Pocket keyboard with "thumbboard" style keys, fits over main unit (see photo)
 other different accessories available from HP or compatible, like GPS, CF WiFi cards etc. (see photo)

Models

Hardware 
The hardware used in the 560 series is very similar to that of the 7xx Jornadas, and also that of the Assabet development platform.

There are three main hardware differences with the 7xx Jornadas. The 7xx devices feature the following:
 640x240 screen
 2D hardware acceleration
 Philips 1344TS audio chip

Processor 
206 MHz Intel StrongARM SA-1110.

The 710, 720, 728, and 820 Jornadas also used this processor.

RAM 
32MiB or 64MiB (see Models).

Display controller chip 
Epson 1356TM.

Audio chip 
Philips UDA1345TS.

This is a low-power, single-chip Analogue-to-Digital Converter and Digital-to-Analogue Converter. It was designed for portable music devices and PDAs.

References

External links 
 https://web.archive.org/web/20061014170658/http://www.handhelds.org/download/projects/jornada/56x/jornada56x.txt
 https://archive.today/20001213020800/http://www.linuxdevices.com/products/PD7399900675.html
 
 http://wwwcip.informatik.uni-erlangen.de/~simigern/jornada-7xx/docs/sa1111-doc.pdf
 http://wwwcip.informatik.uni-erlangen.de/~simigern/jornada-7xx/docs/sa1111-errata.pdf
 
 http://www.nxp.com/pip/UDA1341TS

Windows Mobile Classic devices
HP PDAs